Sahiwal Division (Punjabi) is one of the nine Divisions of Punjab province, Pakistan.

It was formed by merging parts of Lahore Division and Multan Division and took its name Sahiwal from the district and city of the same name, which in turn are named for the Sahi Clan of the Kharal tribe, the traditional inhabitants of the area. On 14 November 2008, Sahiwal Division was reorganised into three districts: Sahiwal District, Okara District, Burewala and Pakpattan District. Sahiwal is the capital of Sahiwal Division. In 1998, the population of Sahiwal was 6,271,247. The population rate of growth was 1.92 percent per annum.

Alexander stayed in this region of Punjab for two years in a time of frequent military conflict.

Location

Sahiwal Division is located at about 30.6 degrees north latitude and 73.1 degrees longitude in east central Pakistan in the Punjab region. It lies on the Pakistan national highway N-5 about halfway between Lahore and Multan. Sahiwal division is bordered by Faisalabad Division to the west; Lahore Division to the north; Bahawalpur Division and India to the east; and, Multan Division to south.

Sahiwal division lies on the floodplain of two rivers. Ravi River lies to the west; and, Satluj River lies to the east. The dry Khushak Bias also passes through the Sahiwal Division, separating the Sahiwal District from the Pakpattan District.

Almost 28,956 acres of the division is forested.

Administration

Sahiwal Division consists of three districts and seven tehsils.

Sahiwal is one of the nine divisions of Punjab, Pakistan. In 2008, after Pakistan national elections, the new democratic government restored the former tier of divisions and appointed Commissionaires for each division.

Sahiwal Division was formed in an area of 10302 km2. Its three districts are Sahiwal District, Pakpattan District and Okara District, each governed by a District Coordination Officer. Sahiwal District has two tehsils; Sahiwal and Chichawatni. Towns in these tehsils include Qadirabad, Yousafwala, Iqbal Nagar, Kassowal, Noorshah, Gogera, Malkahans, Harappa and Ghaziabad.

History

Indus Valley civilisation
Harappa, an archaeological site in Sahiwal Division, which takes its name from a small nearby village has revealed remains of a typical Indus Valley civilisation (3300 BCE - 1300 BCE) fortified Bronze Age city. In about 1900 BCE, the Indus Valley civilisation began to decline. The population may have moved away due to changes in the environment. Jim G. Shaffer and Diana A. Lichtenstein (in ) stated that: "This shift by Harappan and, perhaps, other Indus Valley cultural mosaic groups, is the only archaeologically documented west-to-east movement of human populations in South Asia before the first half of the first millennium B.C.."

Ecological factors that may have been involved in the decline include drying up of the Ghaggar-Hakra River and increased aridity in Rajasthan. The Indus River also began to flow further east and floodings occurred.

Shaffer (as cited in ) suggested: "There were no invasions from central or western South Asia. Rather there were several internal cultural adjustments reflecting altered ecological, social and economic conditions affecting northwestern and north-central South Asia".

Alexander the Great

Alexander the Great (356 BCE - 323 BCE) came to the Sahiwal region in 326 BCE. He conquered reigning local leaders such as Porus the Elder. During his Mallian Campaign of 326 BCE, Alexander followed his retreating opponents, the Mallians, to the city of Multan. The village of "Malli" in Kamalia Tehsil, is reminiscent in name. It is also said that Alexander got a fatal wound from Sahiwal region which later 
became the cause of his death.

Ashoka
Following Alexander's departure from the region, the Punjab region was ruled by Ashoka (reign about 260 BCE to 232 BCE) of the Maurya Empire. After the decline of the Maurya dynasty, the Sahiwal region was ruled by invading forces including the Muslims, Mongols, and Lodhis.

Mughal
From about 1524 CE, the Sahiwal region fell under the rule of the Mughal Empire. Sher Shah Suri (1486 - 1545), extended the Great Trunk Road, which ran from Delhi to Multan. Where the road passes through Gogera, it is known as the Kakhan Wali Sarak.

Sher Shah Suri also constructed a fort at Shergarh, in Okara District. The Mughals' dominance in the Sahiwal area continued until 1739 CE.

Sikh
From the time of the decline of the Mughal Empire, Sahiwal fell under the rule of the Sikh Empire. However, as well as the Sikh Nakkais there were powerful Muslim tribes such as the Kharrals, Sials, Wattus, and Hans in the Sahiwal region.

Between 1804 CE and 1810 CE, Maharaja Ranjit Singh held most of the Sahiwal area. However, the Nawab of Bahawalpur, on the payment of tributes to Ranjit Singh, held a strip of territory along the Sutlej river. Ranjit Singh resumed rule of this territory when Nawab defaulted on his payments. After Ranjit Singh's death in 1839 CE, the Sikh Empire declined.

British

From 1845 CE to 1849 CE, Sahiwal was embroiled in the Anglo-Sikh wars. In 1847, Sahiwal came under control of the British East India Company. In that year, a British revenue officer was sent to Sahiwal to collect land taxes. In 1849, the Sahiwal district was formed with its headquarters in Pakpattan. In 1852, the district was expanded to include an area east of the Ravi river, the "trans-Ravi portion". The district headquarters were moved to Gogera.

In 1865, a railway was opened, and the district headquarters was moved to a village on the line called "Montgomery" after Sir Robert Montgomery, a colonial administrator. In 1967, Montgomery was renamed "Sahiwal".

Indian Rebellion 1857
During the Indian rebellion of 1857, there was an uprising of the Jat clans in Sahiwal. On 26 August 1857, prisoners rioted in an attempted jailbreak. Rai Ahmad Khan Kharal, leader of a local Kharral Jat clan, was detained at Gogera. He escaped, then was apprehended, then was released on bail, together with some other local leaders.

In September 1858 Khan led an insurrection in the Neeli Bar district. He held the jungles of Gogera and had some successes against the British forces. Kamalia Tehsil was sacked. General Sir Crawford Chamberlain (1821 - 1902) moved north from Multan with a small force. At Chichawatni he was besieged for days. The uprising continued for three months. Along with his companions, Murad Fatiana, Shujaa Bhadroo, and Mokha Wehniwal, Khan killed Lord Berkley the Commissioner for Gogera. Several minor actions followed in the open field, until the rebels, driven from the plain into the jungles, were defeated and dispersed. The British troops then inflicted severe punishment on the insurgent clans, destroying their villages, and seizing large numbers of cattle for sale.

The insurrection was centered in a wide area including Ganji Bar, Neeli Bar and Sandal Bar. The arena of conflict was bordered by the Sutlej river, the Ravi River and Chenab River. The area was thickly forested and suitable for resistance actions. For instance, Major Crawford Chamberlain was ambushed at Chichawatni.

Partition of India
Prior to 1947, Sahiwal was part of the Lahore Division of the Punjab Province of India. Then, with the Pakistan Movement for independence came the Partition of India. Sahiwal's minority Hindu and Sikh populations migrated to India. Muslim immigrants from India arrived. Sahiwal became a part of Pakistan. In 2008, the Sahiwal region, after a few changes in borders, became a "division".

Climate
In the Köppen climate classification, Sahiwal has a Semi-arid climate. More precisely, it is intermediate between a Desert climate (BW) and a Humid subtropical climate.

Temperatures in Sahiwal vary between hot and very hot in summer and are mild in winters. In May, June and July, temperatures increase to maximums between 40 and 50 °C. In winter months, the temperature falls to minimums between 5 and 10 °C.

Sahiwal lies on the edge of the Thar Desert at a low altitude and so, wet seasons are warm and dry seasons are cool. Sahiwal is also affected by the monsoon. Precipitation is very heavy in the monsoon, and dry during the rest of the year, with few or no months bringing moderate levels of precipitation.

The annual average rainfall in Sahiwal is approximately 349 mm.

The soil in Sahiwal is fertile. The vegetation is short and scrubby. The land supports grasses, shrubs and some forests.

Economy
The economy of Sahiwal Division depends on agriculture and associated industries. The largest crop is wheat, followed by cotton.

Agriculture
Because there are nearby rivers, Sahiwal is a fertile zone within Punjab province. There is a canal irrigation system. Sahiwal is cultivated for the production of food. A number of types of crops are grown. This is possible because across Sahiwal there is some variation in climatic conditions. Crops farmed in Sahiwal include: wheat, sugarcane, cotton, tobacco, rice, mustard seed and maize. Plants such as rapeseed are grown for production of vegetable oil. Vegetables are cultivated including potato, onion, cauliflower, peas, carrot, turnip and Okra. Fruits grown in Sahiwal include citrus, guava, orange, lemon, mango, dates, jambul, jujube and mulberry.

Sahiwal's sandy region near the dry bed of the Dias river are used for growing cotton and peanuts. Areas in Yousuf and Arif are used to grow corn.

Forestry
Archaeologists suggest that the forests have been present in Sahiwal area since the times of the Indus Valley civilisation. Sculptures, stamps and seals depicting the animals such as bull, elephant, zebra and rhinoceros have been found. These are the animals of a humid subtropical climate.

Sahiwal has 28,956 acres (117 km2) of forested land. Some are in Chichawatni and Okara. Trees in Sahiwal include:
 Sacred fig (Peepal)
 Banyan (Bargad)
 Eucalyptus (Safaida)
 Salvadora persica (Peelu)
 Prosopis cineraria (Jundi)
 Sal
 Tecomella undulata (Okaan)
 Dalbergia sissoo (Shisham)
 Acacia nilotica (Kikar or Babul)
 Azadirachta indica (Neem), and
 Melia azedarach (Bakain)

Cattle

The Sahiwal cattle breed, a dairy breed of Zebu or "humped cattle" is grown in the region. This cattle breed is tick resistant, heat tolerant and resistant to external and internal parasites Due to their heat tolerance and high milk production, Sahiwal cattle are grown in other Asian countries, African nations such as Kenya, Burundi, Somalia, Sierra Leone and Nigeria and Caribbean nations such as Jamaica, and Guyana.

Other livestock types that are grown in Sahiwal include sheep, and goat. Fish and poultry are also in abundant.

The Nili-Ravi is a breed of domestic water buffalo native to the Sahiwal area.

Industry
Sahiwal's industry is cantered around products and services for its agriculture. Some industrial entities in Sahiwal include Mitchell's Fruit Farms Limited, Montgomery Biscuits and Sweets Factory, Engro Foods Limited, rice mills, sugar mills for example, Ittefaq Sugar Mills Limited, and Baba Farid Sugar Mills Limited, pharmaceutical suppliers, tobacco processing units, cotton ginning and pressing units, flour mills, fertilizer companies for example, Fauji Fertilizer Company Limited, vegetable ghee and cooking oil processing units, textile factories, soap and detergent factories, paper and paper board factories, poultry feed suppliers, seed processing units and tanneries.

Education
The average urban literacy rate of Sahiwal Division (Sahiwal, Okara, and Pakpattan) is 60.7 percent. The average rural literacy rate is 33.8 percent.

Institutions
COMSATS University, Sahiwal
 University of Education (established 2002) 
University of Sahiwal, Sahiwal
 Acute Business College.
 Sahiwal Medical College, DHQ Hospital Sahiwal. 
 School of Nursing, DHQ Hospital, Okara.
 Government College of Technology Sahiwal
 Government College Sahiwal (established1942)
 Divisional Public School and College, Sahiwal, 
 District Public School and College, Okara
 Divisional Public School, Pakpattan
 Sahiwal Public School, Sahiwal
College of Advanced Scientific Techniques (CAST), Sahiwal
University of Lahore (UOL), Pakpattan
Quaid-e-Azam College of Engineering and Technology, Sahiwal
Government College University Faisalabad (GCUF), Sahiwal
University of Okara, Okara
Cadet College Okara, Okara

Other notable schools are Ad Alta School Sahiwal, Beaconhouse School System, BloomField Hall, The City School, Army Public School, Sahiwal, Army Public School, Okara, Government College For Women, Sahiwal, Government High School, Sahiwal, Government Mahmoodia High School, Sahiwal, Comprehensive School, Sahiwal, Government Pilot Higher Secondary School, Government Immamia College, Muhammadan Law College, Sahiwal, Multan Law College, Sahiwal, Government Commerce College, The Educators, Punjab Group of Colleges and The Limit Group of Colleges, Okara, Leading college, Sahiwal.

Libraries
Sahiwal Division has following libraries;
 Government Jinnah Public Library, Sahiwal (established 1989)
 COMSATS Sahiwal Library 
 Government Post Graduate College Sahiwal Library is the largest library in Sahiwal Division. 
 Sahiwal Public library (Library Bazm-e-Adab-o-Fikr) is the oldest library of Sahiwal.

Other libraries are Baldia Library, Government College for Women library, Zila Council Library and District Bar Library.

Demography

At the time of the 1998 Census in Pakistan, the population of Sahiwal Division was 6,271,247. The population density was 608 people per square kilometre. Forty-seven percent were female. Seventy-five percent lived in an urban environment. The urban literacy rate was 60.7 percent. The rural literacy rate was 33.8 percent.

According to 2017 census, Sahiwal division had a population of 7,378,065, which includes 3,769,226 males and 3,608,089 females. 
The Sahiwal population includes a small proportion of indigenous people living in pastoral communities. Another proportion are people whose ancestors moved to the area and were allotted lands by the British in about 1849. The Abadkar people were forcibly removed to Sahiwal from other areas of Punjab (especially the east) after the building of the irrigation canal system in Sahiwal. These people became sharefarming tenants of state-owned farms. In 1998, fourteen percent of the Sahiwal Division's population had come to the area in 1947 as a result of the partition of India.

Religion
Islam is the predominant religion in Sahiwal. In 1998, over 98.7 percent of residents in Sahiwal identified as Muslim. Islam was brought to the area by Muhammad Bin Qasim (695 CE - 715 CE) and Fariduddin Ganjshakar. Prior to Independence, most Muslim people in Sahiwal supported the All-India Muslim League and the Pakistan Movement. 
Sahiwal division constitutes 104 Hindus, 7,264,688 Muslims, 108,688 Christians,1,728 Ahmadi followed by 504 scheduled castes and 2,353 others.

Language
Punjabi is the first language of most people in Sahiwal (95%).While, Raangri (2.8%)and Urdu(2%) are also spoken.

Notable people

 Fariduddin Ganjshakar (1179 CE - 1266 CE) known as "Baba Farid" (Punjabi: بابا فرید (Shahmukhi), was a 12th-century Sufi preacher and saint of the Chishti Order of South Asia. Ganjshakar is one of the first major poets of the Punjabi language, and is one of the pivotal saints of the Punjab region.
 Tufail Mohammad (1914 CE - 1958 CE) was a recipient of the Nishan-e-Haider, Pakistan's highest military award, for his contribution to the defence of Pakistan.
 Majeed Amjad (1914 CE - 1974 CE) was a writer of modern Urdu literature. He was educated at the Government College Lahore. He was inspired by the flora of Sahiwal. There is a park named for him.
 Abdus Salam (1926 CE - 1996 CE) was a theoretical physicist who won the 1979 Nobel Prize in physics for his contribution to electroweak theory. He was born in Santokdas a village near haveli lakha tehsil depalpur where his maternal grand father was resided, raised in Jhang and is buried in Rabwah.

Central Jail Sahiwal
The first jail in Sahiwal was the Gogera jail. Prisoners of war were housed there during India's First War of Independence. In 1873, the jail was moved to Sahiwal township and named "Central Jail, Sahiwal".

People who have been housed at the jail include: Jawaharlal Nehru, Zafar Ali Khan, Abul Kalam Azad, Zulfikar Ali Bhutto, Sheikh Mujibur Rahman, Faiz Ahmad Faiz, Habib Jalib, Abdul Qayyum Khan and Agha Shorash Kashmeeri.

Twin cities
Sahiwal city is a twin of Rochdale, Greater Manchester, North West England. There is a direction sign in Rochdale's town centre that reads, "Sahiwal 3960 miles" and points towards Sahiwal.

See also
Divisions of Pakistan
Divisions of Punjab, Pakistan
Harappa
Okara District
Pakpattan District
Kaluwal Mittha Village

References

Divisions of Punjab, Pakistan